William John Stone (October 25, 1925 – May 16, 2004) was a professional American football halfback and defensive back in the All-America Football Conference and the National Football League. He attended Bradley University. He was drafted by the Chicago Cardinals in the 12th round of the 1949 NFL Draft. He was also drafted by the Chicago Bears in the first round of the 1951 NFL Draft after the Baltimore Colts folded.

References

1925 births
2004 deaths
American football defensive backs
American football halfbacks
Bradley Braves football coaches
Bradley Braves football players
Baltimore Colts (1947–1950) players
Chicago Bears players
Sportspeople from Peoria, Illinois
Players of American football from Illinois